Nippolimnophila is a genus of crane fly in the family Limoniidae.

Distribution
Japan.

Species
N. kiusiuensis Alexander, 1930
N. omogiana Alexander, 1955
N. perproducta Alexander, 1957
N. yakushimensis Alexander, 1930

References

Limoniidae
Diptera of Asia